A1 is an album by English-Norwegian pop group A1, released as their North American debut album on 25 June 2002 by Columbia. The album consists of songs from the group's first three studio albums, Here We Come (1999), The A List (2000), and Make It Good (2002).

Track listing

References

A1 (band) albums
2002 albums